Burniestrype is a hamlet in Moray, Scotland.

Villages in Moray
Hamlets in Scotland